Sharaf al-Din Harun Juvayni (also spelled Joveyni) was a Persian statesman and poet from the Juvayni family. He was the son of Shams al-Din Juvayni.

He was executed in July–August 1286 due to a defamation by Fakhr al-Din Mustawfi, who was a cousin of the historian and geographer Hamdallah Mustawfi.

Sources 
 
 
 

1286 deaths
13th-century births
People executed by the Mongol Empire
13th-century Iranian people
Juvayni family
People from Khorasan
Officials of the Ilkhanate